The 1996 Western North America blackouts were two widespread power outages that occurred across Western Canada, the Western United States, and Northwest Mexico on July 2 and August 10, 1996. They were spread 6 weeks apart and were thought to be similarly caused by excess demand during a hot summer.

Though affecting millions, the blackouts were largely an inconvenience, and not emergencies. On both occasions airport operations continued, and power was restored within minutes or hours.

The blackouts raised concerns about the then-recent debates about deregulating electricity utilities.

July 2 blackout
On July 2, 1996, a voltage instability resulted from the loss of steady state equilibrium conditions, caused by reactive power deficiency in the Idaho area. The power failure affected parts of Alberta and British Columbia in Canada, western Mexico, as well as Idaho, Montana, Utah, New Mexico, California, and Arizona, affecting more than two million people.
Most power was restored in an hour or two.

President Bill Clinton directed the United States Department of Energy to investigate the reasons for the widespread power outage and whether it could have been prevented.

August 10 blackout
On August 10, 1996, the western electric grid experienced another massive blackout.

This power outage affected customers in seven western US states, two Canadian provinces, and Baja California, Mexico. Approximately 7.5 million customers lost power for periods ranging from several minutes to six hours. The outage stretched from Canada to New Mexico and knocked out power to 4 million customers amid a triple-digit heat wave.

At 2:06 p.m., the Big Eddy-Ostrander line flashed and grounded to a tree. At 2:52 p.m., the John Day–Marion line (also owned by BPA) flashed to a tree. Due to a circuit breaker being out of service, this also took the Marion–Lane line out of operation. At 3:42 p.m., the Keeler–Allston line arced and grounded to a tree near Hillsboro, Oregon, west of Portland. It was the fourth power line in Oregon to fail in less than two hours. Five minutes later, at 3:47 p.m., the 230 kV Ross–Lexington line (also owned by Bonneville Power Administration) flashed and grounded to a tree near Vancouver, Washington, across the Columbia River from the Portland/Hillsboro area. This started a small fire. One minute later, at 3:48 p.m., the 13 turbines at McNary Dam, on the Columbia about 190 miles upstream from Portland, tripped off line.

Within a few seconds, several dozen lines had opened across the Interconnection, and more than a dozen generating units went offline, leaving Oregon disconnected from California and Northern California disconnected from Southern California. High load and demand coupled with inadequate tree-trimming practices, improper system operation, and out of service equipment, contributed to the severity of the disturbance.

See also
List of power outages
1996 Malaysia blackout

References

North America, Western, 1996
Western North-America summer blackouts
1996 disasters in the United States
July 1996 events in North America
August 1996 events in North America